Zeynəddin is a village and municipality in the Babek District of Nakhchivan, Azerbaijan.  It has a population of 2,377.

References 

Populated places in Babek District